Mitogen-activated protein kinase 4 is an enzyme that in humans is encoded by the MAPK4 gene.

Mitogen-activated protein kinase 4 is a member of the mitogen-activated protein kinase family. Tyrosine kinase growth factor receptors activate mitogen-activated protein kinases which then translocate into the nucleus where it phosphorylates nuclear targets.

The Arabidopsis MAPK4 is important in signalling 

Mechanistically, MAPK4 directly bound and activated AKT by phosphorylation of the activation loop at threonine 308. It also activated mTORC2 to phosphorylate AKT at serine 473 for full activation. MAPK4 overexpression induced oncogenic outcomes, including transforming prostate epithelial cells into anchorage-independent growth, and MAPK4 knockdown inhibited cancer cell proliferation, anchorage-independent growth, and xenograft growth.

References

Further reading

External links 
 MAP Kinase Resource 

EC 2.7.11